Utica Township is one of twelve townships in Chickasaw County, Iowa, USA.  As of the 2000 census, its population was 525.

History
Utica Township was organized in 1858.

Geography
According to the USGS, it contains six cemeteries: Little Turkey, North, Sacred Heart, Saint Marys Catholic of Little Turkey, Saint Marys and Saude Lutheran.

Notes

References
 USGS Geographic Names Information System (GNIS)

External links
 US-Counties.com
 City-Data.com

Townships in Chickasaw County, Iowa
Townships in Iowa